The 22nd annual Daytona 500 was held February 17, 1980, at Daytona International Speedway.

Race report
The 1980 Daytona Speedweeks was marred by the death of Ricky Knotts, who was killed in a crash during the Gatorade Twin 125 qualifying races. There were 42 cars in the field, after planning to only run 40 cars.

Buddy Baker scored a dominant victory, leading 150 of 200 laps. Bonnett was on the lead lap and started the final lap of the race then blew his engine. Earnhardt was one lap down and so the race finished without him starting on a 200th lap. The fast pace of the race contributed to many engine failures. Earnhardt started his 20 years of Daytona 500 misfortune when, while running a close 2nd behind Baker, his team left one lugnut off a wheel on the final pit stop which forced Earnhardt to pit again, dropping a lap off the pace.

Dave Marcis drove this race with a broken rib after a crash at the end of the Sportsman 300 the day before this race; ultimately finishing in 22nd place.

Top 10 finishers

References

Daytona 500
Daytona 500
Daytona 500
NASCAR races at Daytona International Speedway